Cooper Township is the name of some places in the U.S. state of Pennsylvania:
Cooper Township, Clearfield County, Pennsylvania
Cooper Township, Montour County, Pennsylvania

Pennsylvania township disambiguation pages